The Miles B. Carpenter House, a two-story frame dwelling built in 1890, is located at the intersection of Hunter Street and U.S. Route 460 in Waverly, Sussex County, Virginia.  It was added to the National Register of Historic Places on November 13, 1989.  In 1912 the home was purchased by Miles B. Carpenter, owner of a local sawmill, planing mill, and ice delivery business, who became a noted American folk artist.  A photo of the house can be viewed at this referenced website.

Since Carpenter's death in 1985, his house has been preserved as the Miles B. Carpenter Folk Art Museum in which are displayed his tools and carvings and as a gallery to encourage and exhibit the work of young artists in the region.

References

External links

 Miles B. Carpenter Folk Art Museum - official site

Houses completed in 1890
Houses in Sussex County, Virginia
Houses on the National Register of Historic Places in Virginia
National Register of Historic Places in Sussex County, Virginia
Folk art museums and galleries in Virginia
Museums in Sussex County, Virginia